Kimeh may refer to:
 Kimeh, Khuzestan
 Kimeh-ye Olya, Kohgiluyeh and Boyer-Ahmad Province
 Kimeh-ye Sofla, Kohgiluyeh and Boyer-Ahmad Province